Lithonia is a city in eastern DeKalb County, Georgia, United States. The city's population was 2,662 at the 2020 census. Lithonia is in the Atlanta metropolitan area.

"Lithonia" means "city/town of stone". Lithonia is in the heart of the Georgian granite-quarrying and viewing region, hence the name of the town, from the Greek , for “stone”. The huge nearby Stone Mountain is composed of granite, while the Lithonia gneiss is a form of metamorphic rock. The Stone Mountain granite is younger than, and has intruded the Lithonia gneiss.  The area has a history of rock quarries. The mines were served by the Georgia Railroad and Atlanta, Stone Mountain & Lithonia Railway. Some of the rock quarries have been converted to parkland, and the rail lines to rail-trail.

Lithonia is one of the gateways to the Arabia Mountain National Heritage Area, which is largely contained inside Stonecrest, GA.

Geography
Lithonia is located in southeastern DeKalb County at  (33.712658, -84.105897). Interstate 20 passes just south of the community, with access from Exits 74 and 75. Some areas in extreme southern Gwinnett County use a Lithonia postal address near the county line.

History
In 1805, Lithonia began as a small crossroads settlement of farmers. The town grew with the coming of the Atlanta Augusta Railroad in 1845, which allowed the granite quarrying industry in the area to flourish.

Lithonia is the birthplace of the Lithonia Lighting company, one of North America's largest manufacturers of commercial, institutional, industrial and residential light fixtures, which was founded in the city in 1946 but moved to nearby Conyers in the 1950s.

New Birth Missionary Baptist Church, a megachurch which is known for many high-profile funerals, is located in Stonecrest, GA, near Lithonia.

Lithonia Historic District 

The Lithonia Historic District consists of a commercial core surrounded by residential areas, with a period of significance spanning from 1845 to 1964. Stylistic influences in the district include Second Empire, Queen Anne, Folk Victorian, Neoclassical Revival, English Vernacular Revival, Craftsman, and Colonial Revival. The district is bisected by the Georgia/CSX Railroad, which runs perpendicular to the historic commercial core's primary thoroughfare, Main Street. The commercial area extends south from the intersection of Main Street and the railroad, covering a two-block area. The commercial buildings are primarily brick and local granite masonry, with little decorative detailing.  Commercial styles include single retail, multiple retail, and retail and office types. Within the historic district, there is some non-historic infill construction such as the 1968 Lithonia Plaza shopping center.

The residential areas consist architecture typical of late 19th- to mid 20th-century types and styles. Residential neighborhoods also feature locally quarried granite and gneiss. House types and styles include the central hall Georgian cottage, gabled-wing cottage, Queen Anne cottage, New South cottage, pyramid cottage, bungalow, Ranch house, I-House and Queen Anne house.

Landmark properties include the Masonic Lodge (1916), The Lithonia Women's Club (1928), the Lithonia First United Methodist Church (1910), Antioch Baptist Church (1911), Lithonia Presbyterian Church, The Union Missionary Church (1911), the Bruce Street equalization school (c.1953), and The Seminary (1895). Contributing sites in the district include two cemeteries, two parks, the former Georgia Railroad Quarry, and the ruins of the Bruce Street School for African-Americans (1938).

The district is significant under National Register criterion A (association with historic events) and C (architecture), with areas of significance in Architecture, Black and European Ethnic Heritage, Community Planning and Development, Industry, and Transportation.

Demographics

2020 census

As of the 2020 United States census, there were 2,662 people, 938 households, and 524 families residing in the city.

2010 census
Lithonia's city population was 1,924 at the 2010 census, over 799 households, and 560 families residing in the city. The population density was about 1,924 inhabitants per square mile (1,068.9/km2). The racial makeup of the city was 84.3% Black, 8.5% White, 0.05% Native American, 0.2% Asian, and 1.42% from other races. Hispanic or Latino of any race were 5.8% of the population.

There were 799 households, out of which 40.8% had children under the age of 18 living with them, 33.3% were married couples living together, 22.6% had a female householder with no husband present, and 29.9% were non-families. 15.7% of all households were made up of individuals, and 4.8% had someone living alone who was 65 years of age or older.  The average household size was 2.70 and the average family size was 3.25.

In the city, the population was spread out, with 34.4% under the age of 18, 9.0% from 18 to 24, 27.4% from 25 to 44, 17.4% from 45 to 64, and 11.8% who were 65 years of age or older.  The median age was 30 years.  For every 100 females, there were 76.7 males.  For every 100 females age 18 and over there were 63.1 males.

The median income for a household in the city was $53,397, and the median income for a family was $54,792. Males had a median income of $29,500 versus $24,788 for females. The per capita income for the city was $10,605.  About 12.6% of families and 18.9% of the population were below the poverty line, including 31.8% of those under the age of 18 and 25.7% of those 65 and older.

The unincorporated communities located outside the city limits make up almost 75% of the population estimated at over 15,000 inhabitants. Neighborhoods are broken into two ZIP codes: 30058 which includes the City proper, and communities directly outside the city limit, and 30038 located south of Interstate 20 which includes some of the most affluent neighborhoods in DeKalb County.

Shopping 
Lithonia is near to a super-regional shopping center, the Mall at Stonecrest (also known as Stonecrest Mall), and serves as the northernmost point on the Arabia Mountain Path. Much of the mall's available property has yet to be developed.

Hospitals
The three main health facilities in Lithonia are:
Hillandale DeKalb Medical Center is the newest addition to the DeKalb Medical family of hospitals.
Kaiser Permanente runs two community health clinics in Lithonia: Panola Road Clinic, and the Stonecrest Clinic. 
East DeKalb Health Center

Education
DeKalb County Public Schools operates public schools. Lithonia Middle School is the only school located in the city limits of Lithonia.

The schools that serve the city limits of Lithonia are: Stoneview Elementary School in Stonecrest, Lithonia Middle School, and Lithonia High School in Stonecrest (formerly Redan CDP).

Elementary schools in the wider surrounding area:
Edward L. Bouie Sr. Elementary
Marbut Elementary
Shadow Rock Elementary
Rock Chapel Elementary
Princeton Elementary
Redan Elementary
Flat Rock Elementary
Fairington Elementary
Stoneview Elementary
Panola Way Elementary
Murphy Candler Elementary
Browns Mill Elementary
Wynbrooke Traditional Theme School

Middle schools in the surrounding area:
Lithonia Middle School 
Redan Middle School
Salem Middle School
Miller Grove Middle School
DeKalb Academy of Technology and Environment

High schools in the surrounding area:
Lithonia High School (Primary Zoned High School)
Martin Luther King, Jr. High School (Secondary Zoned High School)
Miller Grove High School (Relief High School)
Arabia Mountain High School (Magnet High School)

Universities
Luther Rice University of Theological Studies
Strayer University

Public libraries
DeKalb County Public Library operates the Lithonia-Davidson Library the main library source in Lithonia, which was once privately owned until being incorporated into the DeKalb County Public Library system in 1947.

Other libraries in the Lithonia area include:
Salem- Panola Branch
Redan- Trotti Branch
Stonecrest- Klondike Branch

Parks
Browns Mill/Recreation Center
Bruce Street Park
Davidson-Arabia Mountain/Preserve
Fairington Park
Lithonia Park
Mystery Valley Golf Course 
Redan Park (included Disc Golf, Tennis course, baseball and football fields, pavilion and family kids play areas)
Southeast Athletic Complex
Rock Chapel Park
Salem Park

Postal service
Lithonia's main post office is located on Stone Mountain Street in the heart of Lithonia. Many drop boxes and postal services storefronts are located throughout the communities of Lithonia.

Redan post office located directly outside the city limits of Lithonia provides an alternative to postal drop off and pickup service.

United Parcel Service (UPS) and FedEx also provide alternative postal service to Lithonia.

Transportation
MARTA (Metropolitan Atlanta Rapid Transit Authority) provides connecting bus service to and from Lithonia, and GRTA Xpress (Georgia Rapid Transit Authority) provides commuter bus service to downtown Atlanta from a community park and ride lot.

References

External links

City of Lithonia official website

Cities in Georgia (U.S. state)
Cities in DeKalb County, Georgia
Cities in the Atlanta metropolitan area